The Mỹ Tho River is a river of Vietnam. It flows for  through Bến Tre Province and Tiền Giang Province.

History
The Battle of Rạch Gầm-Xoài Mút took place on this river in 1785.

References

Rivers of Bến Tre province
Rivers of Tiền Giang province
Rivers of Vietnam